Jerry Saintil (born September 15, 1988) is a United States Virgin Islands international footballer.

Career statistics

Club

Notes

International

References

External links
 Jerry Saintil at CaribbeanFootballDatabase

1988 births
Living people
United States Virgin Islands soccer players
United States Virgin Islands international soccer players
Jersey Express S.C. players
Austin Aztex FC players
Central Jersey Spartans players
Association football defenders
Sportspeople from East Orange, New Jersey